Lord of Alconchel is a hereditary title in the Peerage of Spain, granted in 1445 by John II to Gutierre de Sotomayor, Grand master of the Order of Alcántara. The title makes reference to Alconchel, a town in Badajoz.

Lords of Alconchel (1445)

Gutierre de Sotomayor, 1st Lord of Alconchel
Juan de Sotomayor, 2nd Lord of Alconchel
Gutierre de Sotomayor, 3rd Lord of Alconchel
Juan de Sotomayor, 4th Lord of Alconchel
Bernardino Melgar y Abreu, 5th Lord of Alconchel
Juan de la Cruz Melgar y Escoriaza, 6th Lord of Alconchel

See also
List of lords in the peerage of Spain

References

Lords of Spain
Lists of Spanish nobility